The 1981 Tulane Green Wave football team was an American football team that represented Tulane University during the 1981 NCAA Division I-A football season as an independent. In their second year under head coach Vince Gibson, the team compiled a 6–5 record.

Schedule

References

Tulane
Tulane Green Wave football seasons
Tulane Green Wave football